Louise Lamarre Proulx retired in 2008 as a judge on the Tax Court of Canada.

References

Living people
Judges of the Federal Court of Canada
Canadian women judges
Year of birth missing (living people)